Germany Shore (previously titled as Reality Shore)  is a German and a Swiss reality television series on the premium sector OnePlus and Joyn and on the television channel 3+ and MTV Germany. It was first broadcast on November 17, 2021, and is the German and Swiss offshoot of the American show Jersey Shore. The programme follows the daily lives of 9 housemates, as they live together for a number of weeks. The house was located in Crete in Greece. The second season premiered on December 14, 2022 in Switzerland on OnePlus, and on December 15 of that year in Germany on Paramount+.

Series

Cast
 Bellydah

 Jessy
 Walentina Doronina
 Antonia (season 2–present)
 Dana Feist (season 2–present)
 Dino Strukar (season 2–present)
 Elia Berthoud (season 2–present)
 Fabio de Pasquale (season 2–present)
 Germain Wolf (season 2–present)
 Jonathan "Jona" Steinig (season 2–present)
 Juluis Tkatschenko (season 2–present)
 Peter Kujan (season 2–present)
 Venance Gwladys Amvame (season 2–present)
Previous:

 Emanuel R. Brunner (season 1, 2)
 Mia Madisson (season 1, 2)
 Yasin Mohamed (season 1–2)
 Anthony (season 1)
 Danilo Cristilli (season  1)
Gina Alisia De Rossa  (season 1)
 Jessica Fiorini (season 1)
 Nara (season 1)
 Nic (season 1)
 Niko (season 1)
 Silvio (season 1)
 Emilija Mihailova (season 2)
 Hatidza (season 2)

Special Guests:

 Calvin Kleinen (season 1)
 Melody Haase (season 1)
 Elena Miras (season 1)
 Marina (season 2)

Duration of cast 

 = Cast member is featured in this episode.
 = Cast member arrives in the house.
 = Cast member returns to the series.
 = Cast member voluntarily leaves the house.
 = Cast member returns to the house.
 = Cast member leaves the series.
 = Cast member does not feature in this episode.
  = Cast member features in this episode despite not being an official cast member at the time.
 = Cast member is not officially a cast member in this episode.

Episodes

Series overview

Series 1 (2021)

Series 2 (2022)

References

2020s German television series
2021 German television series debuts
2021 German television seasons
2022 German television seasons
German-language television shows
German reality television series
German television series based on American television series
Television shows filmed in Greece